Maureen Modiselle was the premier of North West Province, South Africa from 2009 until her early removal in 2010.  She was born in Vryheid, on 7 February 1941.  Modiselle returned to Mafikeng in 1990, after spending many years in North America and Canada.  She is currently serving as the High Commissioner of South Africa to the Republic of Trinidad and Tobago.

References 

Mrs Maureen Modiselle. "Mrs Maureen Modiselle", WhosWho, 23 October 2009 .
Modiselle's Profile. "Modiselle's Profile" NWPG Online, 23 October 2009 .

1941 births
Living people
People from Vryheid
African National Congress politicians
Premiers of North West (South African province)
South African women in politics
Women premiers of South African provinces
University of Toronto alumni